Choe Eon-wi (868–944) was a Korean civil minister and calligrapher from the Gyeongju Choe clan during the end of Silla and the next ruling state, Goryeo. He was referred to as one of "the three Choes" along with Choe Chi-won, a renowned scholar, and Choe Seung-u. In 885, he went to Tang China to study, and passed a civil examination there. Choe, however, returned to Korea 909. After Silla was collapsed and integrated into Goryeo, he served as the titles of Taeja sabu, and Munhan and others. His calligraphic works include Nangwon Daesa Ojintapbimyeong (朗圓大師悟眞塔碑銘) and the epitaph on the stupa for Master Jinghyo at Heungnyeongsa temple in Yeongwol.

See also
Choe Chi-won
Choe Hang

References

Gyeongju Choe clan
868 births
944 deaths
10th-century Korean poets
10th-century Korean calligraphers
9th-century Korean calligraphers
9th-century Korean poets
10th-century Korean philosophers